DZRH News Television, stylized as DZRHTV, is a Philippine pay television news channel owned by Manila Broadcasting Company. Its programs are primarily from MBC's flagship radio station DZRH and station-produced programs, occupied by the timeslots of radio dramas.

DZRH News Television is the second free-to-air channel that re-broadcasts news from a radio station, after DZMM launched its own TV channel, while other stations soon followed such as DZRJ (for Radyo Bandido TV), DWIZ (for ALIW Channel 23) and 92.3 Radyo5 True FM (for One PH). The channel is also livestreaming on YouTube.

History

On October 1, 2007, DZRH-TV was originally launched as a pay television channel known as "TV Natin". Back then, its original programming consisted of archived DZRH programs (including radio dramas). In 2008 however, TV Natin evolved into a RadyoVision format, simulcasting most of DZRH's live programming schedule, and was eventually rebranded as RHTV. In October 2013, the network was rebranded again as "DZRH News Television" as part of the radio station's integration of its news and public affairs division.

Between October 2 and November 10, 2019, DZRH News Television went off the air after its studios, along with its sister MBC Manila radio stations, were affected by a major fire that originated in the nearby Star City theme park. While DZRH radio resumed regular programming at the following day (October 3) at 4 am from its backup studios at BSA Twin Towers, the station's video feed for DZRH News Television was temporarily replaced by the station's live audio feed; however, the live video streaming of DZRH's programming is available on Facebook live on the station's FB page. The channel returned on air on November 26, when DZRH has moved again to the Design Center of the Philippines within CCP Complex on November 11 and its satellite feed was restored.

Prior to the 82nd anniversary of its radio counterpart, on June 30, 2021, the station launched a new simplified logo and branding as DZRH TV, but the channel is still known as DZRH News Television. On November 15, 2021, the channel updated its new on-screen graphic presentation and slogan "Sama-Sama Tayo, Pilipino!" (lit We're all Filipinos!) along with the new logos of all MBC radio stations. Most of its programs also launched their new title card.

On December 17, 2021, DZRH News Television and its sister station DZRH returned to the MBC Building with new brand new studios for both radio and TV operations.

Programming

DZRH News Television airs the live video feed of DZRH programs, except selected radio dramas, the religious radio program Tinig ng Pagasa and during sign-off (until 2020; the channel currently signs off every Sundays from 12 am to 4 am, thus also showing the logo of the channel instead with no audio present).

News personalities
 Deo Macalma
 CD Argarin
 Cesar Chavez
 Henry Uri
 Angelo Palmones
 Anthony Taberna (formerly from ABS-CBN, DZMM and Also with ALLTV)
 Gerry Baja
 Mae Binauhan
 Rey Sibayan
 Raymund Dadpaas
 Milky Rigonan
 Leth Narciso
 Rommel Fuertes
 Atty. Rhina Seco
 Karen Ow-Yong
 Dennis Antenor, Jr. (Moved to Aliw Broadcasting Corporation)
 Morly Alinio
 Gorgy Rula
 Kisses Jabson
 Ricky Alegre
 Ruby Cristobal
 Cheska San Diego-Bobadilla
 Faith Salaver
 Elaine Bensal
 Atty. Cheryl Adami-Molina
 Pamela Adriano
 Thea Pecho-Corpuz
 Angelica Cosme
 Regi Espiritu
 Glady Mabini
 Barbie Atienza
 Fr. Manuel "Bong" Bongayan, SVD
 Ed Montilla
 Andy Verde
 Cecile Guidote-Alvarez
 Malou Cabral
 Joaquin Manansala
 Sec. Jesus Crispin Remulla
 Atty. Dodo Dulay
 Ed Javier
 Pao Cupino
 Jonathan dela Cruz
 Teodoro Locsin Jr.
 Sen. JV Ejercito
 Raquel Monteza
 Flor Abanto
 JV Pascual
 Cory Quirino
 Peache Gonzales

Radio reporters
 Boy Gonzales
 Edwin Duque
 Sherwin Alfaro
 Val Gonzales
 Noche Cacas
 Christian Maño
 Liezel Once
 Edniel Parrosa
 Nicole Lopez
 Mavel Arive
 Elaine Apit
 Kristan Carag
 Jecelle Ricafort
 Grace Sansano 
 Freddie Fajardo
 Adi Amor
 Jun Dimacutac
 Jimmy Angay-Angay
 Danny Cumilang
 Renz Belda
 Rex Cantong
 Jayne Bantayan
 Aine Grace Bravo
 Ruel Saldico
 Benjie Antiquia
 Rey Boton, Jr.

DZRH News TV stations

See also
Manila Broadcasting Company
DZRH
Radyo Natin
Pacific Broadcasting Systems

References

External links
Official Website

24-hour television news channels in the Philippines
Television channels and stations established in 2007
Manila Broadcasting Company
Television networks in the Philippines
Filipino-language television stations